Medias Hermanas is a 2021 Peruvian comedy film directed by Ani Alva Helfer. Produced by and starring Gianella Neyra and Magdyel Ugaz, the film was released in theaters on November 18, 2021. It also features the acting participation of Tiago Correa, Leonardo Torres Vilar, Nacho Di Marco, Thiago Vernal and Miguel Dávalos. It is the first Peruvian film produced, starred and directed by women.

Synopsis 
Victoria and Marita discover that they are half-sisters during their father's wake. Victoria is going through financial problems and decides to sell the beach house that her father left her because it is about to be foreclosed on. To do so, he must obtain authorization from Marita, who agrees as long as they spend the summer together.

Cast 

 Gianella Neyra as Victoria.
 Magdyel Ugaz as Marita.
 Tiago Correa as Koki.
 Leonardo Torres Vilar as Roman.
 Nacho Di Marco as Gaitan.
 Miguel Dávalos as Luciano.
 Thiago Vernal as Agustín.

Production 
Medias hermanas was recorded in the first months of 2021, complying with strict biosafety protocols to safeguard the health of all staff and thus avoid contagion by COVID-19. It is one of the first film productions developed during the COVID-19 pandemic in Peru. A press conference was held on November 9, 2021.

Reception 
In its first weekend of release, Medias hermanas managed to attract 19,000 spectators to the cinema. To culminate it with more than 30,000 spectators, becoming the best national premiere since the reopening of theaters.

References

External links 

 

2021 films
2021 comedy films
2021 LGBT-related films
Peruvian comedy films
Peruvian LGBT-related films
Tondero Producciones films
2020s Peruvian films
2020s Spanish-language films

Films set in Peru
Films shot in Peru
Films about sisters
Films about families